Tom Jones is 1917 British comedy film directed by Edwin J. Collins and starring Langhorn Burton, Sybil Arundale and Will Corrie. It is an adaptation of the 1749 novel Tom Jones by Henry Fielding.

Premise
After being disgraced at home Tom Jones enjoys a series of adventures on the road to London.

Cast
 Langhorn Burton - Tom Jones
 Sybil Arundale - Molly Seagrim
 Will Corrie - Squire Western
 Wyndham Guise - Squire Allworthy
 Bert Wynne - William Blifil
 Nelson Ramsey - Thwackum
 Dora De Winton - Miss Western
 Jeff Barlow - Lieutenant Waters

References

External links
 
 

1917 films
British historical comedy films
1910s historical comedy films
Films directed by Edwin J. Collins
Films set in England
Films set in London
Ideal Film Company films
Films based on British novels
Films based on works by Henry Fielding
British silent feature films
British black-and-white films
1917 comedy films
1910s English-language films
1910s British films
Silent historical comedy films